Room V is the fifth album by the progressive metal group Shadow Gallery, released in 2005 (see 2005 in music). It continues the story started in Tyranny, picking up after Tyranny's Act II. It is the band's first album not featuring longtime keyboardist Chris Ingles, although he did have input in the album's writing process before his departure. It is also their last album to feature longtime lead vocalist Mike Baker, who died of a heart attack in 2008.

The cover art was done by Rainer Kalwitz, who also did the art for Tyranny.

Track listing
All titles and song lengths taken from the Room V liner notes.

 The bonus disc also includes amultimedia segment titled The Story of Room V that can be accessed on a computer's CD ROM.
 The track "Joe's Spotlight" is a drum solo performed by Joe Nevolo.
 The track "She Wants to Go Home" is an instrumental track.
 The track "Floydian Memories" is a big medley composed by Pink Floyd songs extracts, though some parts are not:
 The song segment named "Tienneman's Square" and the sung part "And I grief for my sister" fragment is from  Roger Waters's solo album Amused to Death, track "Watching TV".
 The section "Baby Lemonade" is a song composed by an ex-Pink Floyd member, Syd Barrett.

Plot

Manhunt
This is an instrumental track. The story begins where it was left off. Eight hours later, the Man is still running and hiding from the government and searching for his "lover".

This song is as fast as the song "Chased" from Tyranny. The fourth quarter of the song resurrects the piano melody from "Christmas Day", as the time is still Christmas. "Manhunt" ends with a calmed section like "Chased".

Comfort Me 
At last, the Man joins his lover (portrayed, again, by Laura Jaeger). Both are tired of running and hiding, but they realize how comfortable and safe they feel when they're together, and believe their. So, they promise one another to be always together.

The Andromeda Strain 
Her journal reveals her past. She was previously working on a cure for a weaponized version of smallpox. She used her own DNA to create a serum that can cure it. However, she stumbled on evidence that her employer wanted to cause a small outbreak of the disease to drive up demand for the serum before they release it. She stole the formula, sabotaged her work and ran away from them, putting her in the situation she was in at the start of Tyranny.

The title of this track is a clear reference to the book The Andromeda Strain, although it is not based on the book itself.

Vow 
Soon the Man proposes to her, and the two get married, hoping to forget their past lives.

Birth of a Daughter 
This is the second instrumental track and, as its title implies, the Woman has given birth to a daughter named Alaska. The song builds towards a brief moment of calm, happy ambience as Alaska is born.

Death of a Mother 
This is the third instrumental, and the sequel to the previous track. It opens with a sudden mood change from happy to dark, and the sound of a heart monitor which soon flatlines, leading into a chaotic instrumental that ends with wrenching guitar solos. As its title points, the Woman has died in childbirth, leaving the Man alone with his daughter.

Lamentia
The Man is broken, as his wife promised she would never leave during "Comfort Me", but she left so soon. The vocal arrangement is identical to "Comfort Me" as the Man remembers this broken promise. He claims that she is in the hands of God, while he must live in this world.

Seven Years
This is the fourth instrumental, and as its title indicates, seven years have passed since the Woman's death. The Man's daughter has grown healthy. The mood is lush and innocent.

Dark
This is the fifth and final instrumental. The peaceful life of the Man changes as a shattering window and a very high pitched scream is heard. Beside the scream, it can be heard that the word "daddy" is shouted twice. The remainder of the piece is dark ambience.

Torn
The Man enters the room, only to find out that Alaska was kidnapped, and all of his emotions are let loose. He says he never heard the scream, and starts to curse the kidnappers. He wonders himself if he can ever escape from his past. Although he knows it is likely that the culprit is the New World Order, who would have staged the kidnapping to draw the Man out, his daughter is the only thing that matters in his life now.

The Archer of Ben Salem
In the early morning the Man heads out into the forest determined to bring Alaska back alive, but he sees a soldier with a crossbow aimed at him. The Archer (portrayed by Carl Cadden-James), from a special U.S. Special Forces segment fighting the New World Order (who chased the Man previously on Tyranny), has come with news.

He reveals that the smallpox virus is in the wrong hands, and that they have tried to recreate the serum, but they haven't achieved it. So the Archer reveals that he also carries the same rare blood his wife had, implying Alaska has this blood too, and that her blood is essential to create a vaccine.

The Archer also reveals that the Man's wife didn't die naturally, but she was killed by Mossad, the Intelligence from Israel, to steal blood from her (from the baby; they stole some blood from the Woman's womb). The Archer discloses that the New World Order organization is behind all this, and that U.S. Special Forces have a key mission for the Man to perform.

Encrypted 
The Archer takes the Man to a well hidden town, to the back room of a library. Here the Man works on the serum, shaping encrypted lines, as the Archer stands guard. It is here that he discovers that the NWO is planning to unleash the plague, and sell the serums to those fortunate enough to pay the high fees for it. When the Man has finished, a scientist takes the disc and nods his head.

It is also revealed that the codeword and keyword for the serum are "Room V" and "Tyranny" respectively; the Man uses this information to organize a resistance.

Room V 
The Man forms a band of six members, which are actually Shadow Gallery themselves (in an act of breaking the fourth wall), and it is implied that Mike Baker is equivalent to the Man. They write the serum key into Tyranny and Room V, knowing that because of Shadow Gallery's underground status, they can deliver the serum to the world without the New World Order knowing about it. A brief binary code is listed in the album booklet to the left of the song lyrics. The listeners are urged to join the resistance themselves by supporting Shadow Gallery. A five-minute jam session ends the song and fades into the sound of rain.

Rain 
As the Man has finished his work with the U.S. Special Forces, he continues to search for his lost daughter within the woods of Alaska. His entire mission may have saved the world, but it also has destroyed everything he has ever lived for – hence the metaphor "Their antidote is poison". He is tired of this world and this life, and begs to his dead wife for her shelter. It is implied that the Man may have died at the end, but his ultimate fate and that of Alaska's is left open-ended.

Personnel
All credits taken from the Room V liner notes.

Shadow Gallery
 Carl Cadden-James - Bass guitar, backing vocals, Archer on "The Archer of Ben Salem", flute
 Brendt Allman - Acoustic and electric guitars, Vocals
 Gary Wehrkamp - Guitars, keyboards, backing vocals
 Joe Nevolo - Drums and percussion
 Mike Baker - lead vocals

Additional musicians
 Laura Jaeger - vocals on "Comfort Me"
 Libby Molnar - part of Alaska on "Dark"
 Mark Zonder - drums on "One in the Crowd" and a portion of "Floydian Memories"
 Arjen Lucassen - vocals throughout "Floydian Memories"; guitar solo in "Seven Years" and in the extract "Shining On"
 Jim Roberti - vocals throughout "Floydian Memories"
 Joe Stone - first guitar solo on "The Archer of Ben Salem"

References

Shadow Gallery albums
2005 albums
Rock operas
Concept albums
Inside Out Music albums